West Virginia Route 270 is an east–west state highway located entirely within Harrison County, West Virginia. The western terminus of the route is at U.S. Route 19 just outside the western edge of West Milford. The eastern terminus is at Interstate 79 exit 110 in Lost Creek.

WV 270 was formerly County Route 27.

Major intersections

References

270
Transportation in Harrison County, West Virginia